David Nemeth (born 18 March 2001) is an Austrian professional footballer who plays as a defender for 2. Bundesliga club FC St. Pauli.

Club career
On 5 October 2020, Nemeth joined Sturm Graz on a season-long loan.

References

2001 births
Living people
Austrian footballers
Association football defenders
Austria youth international footballers
SV Mattersburg players
1. FSV Mainz 05 players
1. FSV Mainz 05 II players
SK Sturm Graz players
FC St. Pauli players
Austrian Football Bundesliga players
Bundesliga players
2. Bundesliga players
Regionalliga players
Austrian expatriate footballers
Austrian expatriate sportspeople in Germany
Expatriate footballers in Germany
Austrian people of Hungarian descent
People from Eisenstadt
Footballers from Burgenland